An unmanned store is a retail concept in which there are no service personnel and no cashiers in the store. The transactions are handled through a mobile application. Unlike an automated convenience store, the unmanned store concept relies on smartphone-related technologies and artificial intelligence to remove the traditional features of a store.

History

First developments 
In 2012, the Cisco Internet Business Solutions Group published a paper on the unmanned store possibilities enabled by the recent rapid adoption of smartphones and tablets. In 2014, the company ShelfX developed the first version of unmanned stores. Customers could swipe their cards on their phones to pay in the store and go without checking out at the cashier. In February 2016, the first unmanned store of Sweden opened in Viken.

US-China race 

In December 2016, Amazon announced the launch of unmanned store "Amazon Go" and began research and development. Until January 22, 2018, it officially opened in Seattle, Washington, and opened up general consumer experience and purchase. On May 7, 2019, Amazon announced that it will open its first unmanned store, Amazon Go, in New York. The address is located on the second floor of Brookfield Plaza Shopping Center in New York City.

While Amazon first announced the release of unmanned stores in the US, China started to compete with the USA in the adoption and growth of domestic unmanned stores. Taobao launched the "Tao Cafe" pop-up unmanned store in Hangzhou in July 2017. Alibaba opened an unmanned experience store in January 2018. Other Chinese retail giants such as Jingdong and WeChat also opened unmanned flash Stores. Japan's Lawson announced in December 2017 that it will introduce unmanned stores this year. The Signature concept store in South Korea opened on May 16th on the 31st floor of Lotte World Tower, the tallest building in Seoul. On January 29, 2018, Taiwan also launched 7-11's first unmanned store X-STORE. By 2017, an estimated 200 unmanned stores had opened in China.

Rapid decline 

As soon as 2018, the unmanned store bubble started to pop in China, with many stores closing and facing bankruptcy. The online retailer JD.com had announced 5,000 virtual shelves in July 2018, but retracted from this engagement 6 months later. One reason for the rapid downfall of unmanned stores is the failure of the pioneering stores to create an authentic "just-walk-out" experience, which killed the convenience of shopping there. While the focus was on technology, many stores neglected the customer experience aspect of their shops.

Description 

Unmanned stores are completely self-serve and self-checkout, and there are no waiting lines at the cashier. The registering of bought products and their payments are done with a mobile application.

The ceiling of the entire store is equipped with artificial intelligence camera system and machine algorithms. From the moment the customer enters the store, the camera will record the customer's moving route, browse the product, take, view the label or return the product. Wait for the action, and then send the image to the machine for image recognition. As long as the customer picks up a certain item, it will automatically be added to the virtual shopping cart in the APP. If the customer does not want to purchase the product and put it back on the shelf, the virtual shopping cart in the APP will also be automatically deleted. In the end, when customers choose their products, they do not have to wait in line for checkout. Because there is no checkout counter in the store, customers just need to walk directly out of the door of the store. There is also potential for political controversy, as it has been suggested that some of these stores do not automate jobs but essentially relocate them to overseas centers.

See also 
 Automated retail
 Automated convenience store

References

Retail formats